The 2020 UTEP Miners football team represented the University of Texas at El Paso in the 2020 NCAA Division I FBS football season. The Miners were led by third–year head coach Dana Dimel and played their home games at the Sun Bowl. They competed as members of the West Division of Conference USA (C–USA).

Previous season
The Miners finished the 2019 regular season 1–11 and 0–8 in C–USA play to finish in last (seventh) in the West Division. They were not eligible to play in any post season bowl game.

Preseason

Award watch lists 
Listed in the order that they were released

C–USA media days
The C–USA Media Days were held virtually for the first time in conference history.

Preseason All–C–USA teams
N/A

Schedule
UTEP announced its 2020 football schedule on January 8, 2020.

The Miners had games scheduled against FIU, Nevada, New Mexico State, Rice, Southern Miss, Texas Tech and UAB that were canceled due to the COVID-19 pandemic.

Game summaries

Stephen F. Austin

at Texas

Abilene Christian

at Louisiana–Monroe

at Louisiana Tech

at Charlotte

at UTSA

at North Texas

References

UTEP
UTEP Miners football seasons
UTEP Miners football